Uresiphita gilvata is a moth of the family Crambidae. It was first described by Johan Christian Fabricius in 1794 and is found in Europe and North Africa.

The wingspan is 29–37 mm. The forewing is greyish to light brown sometimes whitish bands either side of the median area (sometimes obsolete).The hindwing is pale  or bright yellow with a black margin. The lines vary from faint to clear. The postmedian line is undulating and the antemedian line is almost straight. 

Adults are on wing from September to October depending on the location.

The larvae feed on various low-growing herbaceous plants, including Genista, Cytisus and Ulex.

It is listed as a synonym of Uresiphita polygonalis by some sources.

References

External links
 
 "63.011 BF1369 Uresiphita gilvata (Fabricius, 1794)". UKMoths

Pyraustinae
Moths described in 1794
Moths of Africa
Moths of Europe
Taxa named by Johan Christian Fabricius